Isabel Quintanilla (1938 – 24 October 2017) was a Spanish visual artist belonging to the new Spanish realism movement. Her paintings usually portray still life, describing simple objects and views from every day life, as well as landscape paintings.

Biography 
Isabel Quintanilla was born in Madrid in 1938. She was the daughter of José Antonio Quintanilla, a Spanish Republican commandant killed by the fascists in the franquist concentration camp of Valdenoceda. In 1953, at the age of fifteen, she entered the Escuela Superior de Bellas Artes. She graduated six years later, in 1959. In 1960, Quintanilla received a scholarship and became an illustration intern at Instituto Beatriz Galindo. Soon after that, she married the sculptor Francisco López.
In 1982, she was granted a Bachelor of Fine Arts by the Universidad Complutense de Madrid. She then began drawing classes at a workshop hosted by Trinidad de la Torre; after that, she took classes with Gutiérrez Navas and Maruxia Valero.

She died on 24 October 2017 at the age of 79.

Solo exhibitions 
 1966 – Galeria Edurne, Madrid   
 1968 – Galeria La Pasarela, Seville    
 1970 – Galeria Egam, Madrid; Galerie Buchholz, Munich   
 1974 – Galerie Herbert Meyer-Ellinger, Frankfurt   
 1980 – Kunstverein, Braunschweig

References 

1938 births
2017 deaths
Spanish still life painters
20th-century Spanish painters
20th-century Spanish women artists
21st-century Spanish painters
21st-century Spanish women artists
Artists from Madrid